Giacomo "Jack" Lopresti (born 23 August 1969) is a British Conservative Party politician. He has been the Member of Parliament (MP) for Filton and Bradley Stoke since the 2010 general election.

Early life and career
Lopresti was born on 23 August 1969 in Southmead in Bristol. After leaving school, Lopresti worked in his family ice cream business for over ten years. A former estate agent and mortgage broker, he worked for the Conservative Party as a Regional Development Officer and in the Conservative Party Treasurer's Department.

Lopresti served in the Territorial Army as a gunner with 266 Commando Battery, Royal Artillery from 2007. He served, as a mobilised reservist, with  29 Commando RA for a year and was deployed in Helmand Province, in Afghanistan, on Operation Herrick 9 for five months over Christmas and New Year 2008/9. Whilst in Afghanistan, Lopresti ran the Camp Bastion Half Marathon, for Help for Heroes, on New Years Day 2009. From 2011 to 2013, Lopresti served as a trooper in the Royal Wessex Yeomanry, an army reserve cavalry unit.

Political career
Lopresti unsuccessfully stood as the Conservative candidate in the Bedminster ward of Bristol City Council in 1995. He was again unsuccessful when he stood in Hartcliffe ward in 1997 and Redland ward in 1998, but was subsequently elected in the Stockwood Ward in 1999. He worked as councillor in that ward until May 2007, when he stood down and a new Conservative candidate won the seat.

He stood unsuccessfully as the Conservative Party candidate for the Bristol East constituency in 2001, and for the South West at the European Parliament elections in 2004. Although the Conservative Party did win three seats in the region, Lopresti was the sixth candidate for the seven seats that were available.

Lopresti was a member of the Conservative Party's A-List in 2006. At the 2010 general election, he was first elected as Member of Parliament (MP) for Filton and Bradley Stoke, a constituency newly created after boundary changes.

In 2011, he was a member of the special Select Committee set up to scrutinise the Bill that became the Armed Forces Act 2011. He also served on the Northern Ireland Affairs Committee

Lopresti is a member of the Conservative Friends of Israel group, and has attended delegations of that group including during the Operation Defensive Shield conflict when he visited  in 2014 for an Israeli military briefing on the Iron Dome air defence system.

At the 2015 UK general election, he retained his seat with an increased majority of almost 10,000 votes.

Lopresti supported Brexit in the 2016 EU referendum.

In July 2016, Lopresti was criticised for sponsoring and hosting a parliamentary event at which Bahrain's relationship with the UK was to be celebrated, after the MP had received several thousand pounds' worth of funding for foreign trips to the country. Opposition MPs objected to him taking gifts from a country whose human rights record had been criticised. Lopresti had faced further questions over one of the trips to Bahrain, which was paid for by the state's foreign affairs ministry, when it was reported he had attended it with fellow MP Andrea Jenkyns a month after their affair had been revealed. Neither of them were members of The Conservative Middle East Council (who had organised the trip from the UK side). Lopresti responded that the trip centred around the Bahraini Airshow, which was relevant to his defence brief, while he argued more generally that Bahrain is one of the country's key strategic allies in the Gulf and that the Bahrainis were in the process of building the UK's first naval base east of Suez since the 1970s.

Lopresti was subject to a failed attempt before the 2017 general election by some members of his local party to deselect him as the Conservative Candidate for Filton and Bradley Stoke. This followed reports in the press that he had been having an extramarital affair with a fellow MP. There was, he said, a "vicious smear campaign" in the constituency and an "attempt to destroy my character and reputation" after revelations about his private life. Lopresti said he had made a complaint to the police over a letter urging Lopresti's deselection, which had been circulated by a "former very bitter party member and possibly a disgruntled employee", and appeared to have broken data protection laws. He was re-selected.

At the 2017 UK general election, he retained his seat, but with a decreased majority.

In Parliament, Lopresti has served on the Northern Ireland Affairs Committee, Armed Forces Bill Committee and Defence Committee.

In December 2017, BBC News Online reported that Lopresti was facing an investigation after his ex-office manager made a formal complaint about his behaviour, following her resignation. A senior Conservative councillor in Bristol subsequently claimed there was "ample grounds" to believe the bullying allegations surrounding the MP due to his "character flaws" and past behaviour. However, two former staff members said they had had a good relationship with Lopresti, and that he was a good employer. Subsequent to this, the BBC reported on 11 July 2019 that the ex-office manager, Jo Kinsey, felt she had been 'vindicated' following her complaint, having received a letter of apology from Lopresti following an internal Conservative party investigation. Lopresti said he categorically rejected the allegations, and had concerns about the inquiry process.

In the December 2019 general election, Lopresti retained his seat once again, with a slightly greater majority than in 2017.

On 8 April 2020 during the coronavirus pandemic, Lopresti sent a letter to cabinet minister Robert Jenrick asking him to reopen churches for Easter.

Personal life
Lopresti, who is of Italian ancestry, is divorced from his former wife Lucy, the daughter of Lord Cope of Berkeley; the couple had three children.

In December 2015, it was revealed that Lopresti was having an extramarital affair with fellow MP Andrea Jenkyns. Following his divorce from Lucy Cope, Lopresti married Jenkyns in St Mary Undercroft in the Palace of Westminster on 22 December 2017 and they have a son named Clifford George, born on 29 March 2017.
Lopresti was diagnosed with bowel cancer in 2013. He has received treatment at the Bristol Royal Infirmary.

References

External links
Official website
Profile at the Conservative Party

Living people
UK MPs 2010–2015
UK MPs 2015–2017
UK MPs 2017–2019
UK MPs 2019–present
Conservative Party (UK) MPs for English constituencies
British politicians of Italian descent
Politics of South Gloucestershire District
Councillors in Bristol
1969 births
Royal Artillery soldiers
British Army personnel of the War in Afghanistan (2001–2021)
English people of Italian descent
Politicians from Bristol
Freemasons of the United Grand Lodge of England
British Yeomanry soldiers
Spouses of British politicians